WIL-FM (92.3 MHz) is a radio station in St. Louis, Missouri. The station serves the St. Louis metropolitan area. Hubbard Broadcasting is the station licensee, authorized by the Federal Communications Commission. Its transmitter is located in St. Louis, and its studios are in Creve Coeur (with a St. Louis address).

Format
WIL-FM plays a variety of country music in St. Louis. WIL-FM personalities include Remy & Kasey (with Brad Barnes as 'Meat'), Marty Brooks and B-Dub. WIL-FM is programmed by Tommy Mattern and the Music Director is Marty Brooks.

History
WIL-FM was first licensed in 1962. It was the sister station to 1430/WIL (now defunct). It took the callsign KFMS on March 30, 1973, but returned to the callsign WIL-FM effective September 1, 1974.

Bonneville International announced its sale of WIL-FM (and 16 other stations) to Hubbard Broadcasting on January 19, 2011. The sale was completed on April 29, 2011.

On January 30, 2017, WIL-FM re-branded as "New Country 92.3".

On October 6, 2020, WIL-FM dropped the "New Country 92.3" branding and began using its call letters in its branding.

HD Radio
Starting in 2012, WIL-FM's HD2 sub-channel began airing Americana/Roots music, and rebranded as "Second Fiddle". Previously, WIL-FM-HD2 was branded as "Kerosene Country", and largely played the same playlist as WIL-FM.

On February 18, 2020, WIL-FM signed on a third sub-channel, and began airing an oldies format, branded as "My Mix 94.3" (with programming simulcasting on translator W232CR (94.3 FM)).

Previous logos

References

External links

WIL Radio Collection finding aid at the St. Louis Public Library

STLRadio.com - Historic information about St. Louis radio broadcasting

Ω
Hubbard Broadcasting
Radio stations established in 1962
1962 establishments in Missouri
Country radio stations in the United States